Francis Daniel Johnson Sr.  (April 9, 1915 – September 26, 1968) was a Canadian politician and the 20th premier of Quebec from 1966 to his death in 1968.

Background

Johnson was born in Danville, Quebec, Canada. He was the son of Francis Johnson, an anglophone labourer of Irish heritage, and Marie-Adéline Daniel, a French Canadian. He was raised bilingually but educated entirely in French.

In 1943, Johnson married Reine Gagné. In 1953, she survived being shot twice by her lover, Radio-Canada announcer Bertrand Dussault, who then committed suicide.

His sons, Pierre-Marc Johnson and Daniel Johnson Jr. also became premiers of Quebec; remarkably, each was a leader of a different party, Pierre-Marc as leader of the sovereigntist Parti Québécois for a brief period in 1985, and Daniel Jr. as leader of the federalist Liberal Party of Quebec for nine months in 1994.

Member of the legislature

Johnson won a by-election in 1946 and became the Union Nationale Member of the Legislative Assembly (MLA) for the district of Bagot. He was re-elected in 1948, 1952, 1956, and 1960.

He served as parliamentary assistant to Premier Maurice Duplessis in 1955 and Deputy House Speaker from 1955 to 1958. He became the target of cartoonists, who portrayed him as Danny Boy.

Cabinet member

Johnson was appointed to the Cabinet in 1958 and served as Minister of Hydraulic Resources until the 1960 election, which was won by the Liberals. He was the minister who started the Manic-5 hydroelectric project in 1958 of which its Daniel-Johnson Dam was named after him.

Party leader

Johnson was elected party leader against Jean-Jacques Bertrand in 1961.    His party lost the 1962 election against Jean Lesage's Liberals, but he was returned to the legislature.

His 1965 book Égalité ou indépendance ("Equality or independence") made him the first leader of a Quebec political party to recognize the possibility of independence for Quebec, saying that Canada should was content to be a Dominion under the British Crown, then Quebec should seek independence. He stated if the English-speaking Canadians did not want to be independent, Quebec could do it alone. His position on the issue was seen to be ambiguous. As he wrote in his book, his position was for "independence if necessary, but not necessarily independence," a reference to Canadian Prime Minister William Lyon Mackenzie King's famous utterance in the World War II conscription debate.

Premier

Under the same slogan, Égalité ou indépendance, his party won the 1966 election and he became Premier of Quebec, a position that he retained until his death. His term was, among other things, qualified by tensions with the Canadian government over constitutional matters because as premier of Quebec, he put forward proposals to reform the Canadian Constitution based on the notion of two equal nations, as opposed to ten equal provinces.

Death 

In July 1968, Johnson suffered a heart attack which kept him from work until mid-September.

On September 25, Hydro-Québec, the government-owned utility organized a ceremony to mark the completion of the Manicouagan-5 Dam. Hundreds of dignitaries, politicians, utility executives, financiers, engineers, and journalists were ferried by plane from Montreal, Quebec City, and New York City to the worksite to attend a banquet and a plaque-unveiling ceremony.

Among the guests were Johnson, his predecessor, Jean Lesage, and René Lévesque, the former Hydraulic Resources minister responsible for the consolidation of all investor-owned utilities into Hydro-Québec in 1962 to 1963. Photographs taken at the banquet show the three men were in excellent spirits, holding hands, and smiling, but relations between the Liberal leader and his former cabinet minister were strained by Lévesque's recent defection to the Mouvement Souveraineté-Association, a precursor of the Parti Québécois.

In his memoirs, Hydro-Québec executive Robert A. Boyd recalls being woken up at 6 a.m. the next morning by his boss, Roland Giroux. "I've got bad news, Robert...," said Giroux, who added that he just found the premier lying dead in his bed. Johnson's demise from another heart attack sent shockwaves at the worksite and across the province, and the dedication ceremony was quickly cancelled.

On September 26, 1969, a year to the day after Johnson's death, the new premier, Jean-Jacques Bertrand, accompanied by Johnson's widow and children, unveiled two plaques and officially dedicated the dam after his predecessor. Both plaques are now side by side at the top of the complex.

Elections as party leader

Daniel Johnson lost the 1962 election.
He won the 1966 election and died in office in 1968.

See also

Politics of Quebec
List of Quebec premiers
List of Quebec general elections
Timeline of Quebec history
Nicknames of politicians and personalities in Quebec

Footnotes

1915 births
1968 deaths
Anglophone Quebec people
French Quebecers
Canadian people of Irish descent
Quebec people of Irish descent
Quebecers of French descent
Canadian people of French descent
Members of the King's Privy Council for Canada
Premiers of Quebec
Union Nationale (Quebec) MNAs
Leaders of the Union Nationale (Quebec)
Université de Montréal alumni
Vice Presidents of the National Assembly of Quebec